Beach Rats is a 2017 American drama film written and directed by Eliza Hittman. It stars Harris Dickinson, Madeline Weinstein, and Kate Hodge. It was screened at the U.S. Dramatic Competition section of the 2017 Sundance Film Festival, and was theatrically released on August 25, 2017, by Neon.

Synopsis
Frankie struggles to escape his Brooklyn home life. He balances his time with a new girlfriend, his friends, and chatting on the internet with older men with whom he meets up for sex and drugs. He does not, however, identify as gay to his girlfriend or male friends. He just "has sex with men", in the words of one of his internet partners. Frankie attempts to compartmentalize his life by having sex with older men, hoping to avoid anyone who might happen to know his friends. This becomes increasingly difficult, however, as he moves about the area and happens to run into them or lures them to meetings for drugs.

Cast

Production
In April 2016, it was announced Eliza Hittman would direct the film, based upon a screenplay she had written. Cinereach and Animal Kingdom produced the film, alongside Secret Engine.

Release
The film had its world premiere at the 2017 Sundance Film Festival on January 23. Shortly after, Neon acquired distribution rights to the film. It was released theatrically on August 25, 2017.

Reception

Critical reception

Beach Rats received positive reviews from film critics. It holds an 85% approval rating on review aggregator website Rotten Tomatoes, based on 106 reviews, with a weighted average of 7.2/10. The website's critical consensus reads, "Empathetic and powerfully acted, Beach Rats takes a clear-eyed yet dreamlike look at a young man's adolescent turmoil." On Metacritic, the film holds a rating of 78 out of 100, based on 29 critics, indicating "generally favorable reviews".

Jay Kuehner, reporting from the 2017 Sundance Film Festival for the Canadian film magazine Cinema Scope, praised the 16 mm photography by Hélène Louvart, invoking a comparison to the visual aesthetic of Moonlight and Beau Travail, as well as the films of Robert Bresson and Philippe Grandrieux.

Accolades

See also 
 List of LGBT-related films directed by women

References

External links

 
 
 

2017 films
2017 drama films
2010s coming-of-age drama films
2017 independent films
2017 LGBT-related films
2010s teen drama films
2010s English-language films
American coming-of-age drama films
American independent films
American teen drama films
American teen LGBT-related films
Films directed by Eliza Hittman
Films set in Brooklyn
Gay-related films
LGBT-related coming-of-age films
LGBT-related drama films
2010s American films